Pongwe Pogwe is a Tanzanian village belonging to the ward of Kang'ata, Handeni District in the northern Region of Tanga. The local demonym is "Wapongwe" ("Samwepongwe" for men and "Mnamweponge" for women).

Geography
In Pongwe Pogwe there is a natural spring water place called Kwekibaya. Kwekibaya is the only source of water for thousands of people and animals.

History

Cultural beliefs
It is believed that if a person not belonging to Wapongwe cleans the water source (the place where water is actually coming out to the surface), Kwekibaya dries out. If this happens, it is only a Wapongwe family member, in Wagongwe tradition, who can please the natural spring to give out water again.

Because of the importance of Kwekibaya, there is a chain of family leaders among the Wapongwe who guide the community in managing the Kibaya in particular and general resources such as deforestation issues (which forest is a reserved one). The last leader of wapongwe is Mkulago (1942-2006). Mkulago died on 28 April 2006 and laid to rest on 30 April 2006 in the Mtonga forest.

References

Populated places in Tanga Region